Henry Herbert Tailors is a tailoring company based in London, England. They produce bespoke shirt and suits and provide fitting and delivery by scooter.

History 
Henry Herbert was founded in 2008 by the late Charlie Baker-Collingwood, the former Publisher of Diplo magazine and Managing Editor of Monocle magazine. With shirt making experience, a Vespa scooter and living in London he combined all three to create the Savile Row by Scooter service. The company today operates from No 9-10 Savile Row. The company's scooters are painted in various suit fabrics.

References

External links 
 Official Website
 Feature in The Telegraph

Clothing companies based in London
British suit makers
Savile Row Bespoke Association members